Matheau "Matt" "Dupe" Hall (born July 27, 1987) is an American retired soccer player.

Career
Hall played college soccer at Tyler Junior College between 2005 and 2006, before transferring to Grand Canyon University for the 2007 and 2008 seasons.

During his college career Hall had stints with several USL PDL and National Premier Soccer League teams in the United States and Canada. After recording seven assists for the Hampton Roads Piranhas in 2007, he left the PDL team before the end of the campaign to join the NPSL's Arizona Sahuaros, whose jersey he donned for the rest of that year and all of 2008.

In 2009, Hall moved on to Canada and the PDL's Thunder Bay Chill, for whom he registered five goals and four assists that season. The defender's performances would catch the eye of Mexican top-flight team Querétaro F.C., who brought him into training camp in 2010.

Hall subsequently had a standout season in PDL, producing 18 assists for the Vermont Voltage in 21 matches and drawing interest from the Rochester Rhinos and Sporting Kansas City, both of whom he joined for training stints. After accepting another camp invite, this one from the Mexican first division's Tijuana, he briefly re-joined the Sahuaros before leading indoor team Las Vegas Knights to the Premier Arena Soccer League final.

Hall signed his first professional contract with USL Professional Division club Los Angeles Blues on April 12, 2012. In the 2012 season, Hall appeared in 10 games where he recorded 5 assist Hall recorded 3 assist for Fort Lauderdale Strikers was released by Fort Lauderdale on July 3, 2014

References

External links
GCU profile

1987 births
Living people
American soccer players
Grand Canyon Antelopes men's soccer players
Tyler Apaches men's soccer players
Thunder Bay Chill players
Virginia Beach Piranhas players
Vermont Voltage players
Arizona Sahuaros players
Orange County SC players
Fort Lauderdale Strikers players
Richmond Kickers players
USL League Two players
USL Championship players
North American Soccer League players
Sportspeople from Virginia Beach, Virginia
Association football defenders